MacArthur Bridge may refer to:

 MacArthur Bridge (St. Louis), a bridge in St. Louis, Missouri, United States
 MacArthur Bridge (Detroit), a bridge  in Detroit, Michigan, United States
 MacArthur Bridge (Burlington), a bridge in Burlington, Iowa, United States (replaced with the Great River Bridge)
 MacArthur Bridge (Manila), a bridge in Manila, Philippines
 Collection of two bridges across the Keelung River as part of the MacArthur Thruway in Taipei.